LCAD may refer to:
Laguna College of Art and Design, Laguna Beach, California, USA
 Leeds College of Art, Leeds, England, formerly Leeds College of Art and Design
Loughborough College of Art and Design, now merged into Loughborough University